Casey Scheidegger (born January 31, 1988) is a Canadian curler from Lethbridge, Alberta. She is a former provincial junior champion and is currently a skip on the World Curling Tour.

Career

Juniors
Scheidegger won the 2009 Alberta Junior Curling championships with teammates Kalynn Park, younger sister Jessie Haughian, and Jayme Coutts. The rink represented Alberta at the 2009 Canadian Junior Curling Championships, where they finished the round robin in second place with a 9–3 record. However, they lost the semi-final to Manitoba's Kaitlyn Lawes.

Women's
Scheidegger has been playing in World Curling Tour events since the 2004–05 season. As of the 2019–20 season, she has played in 19 Grand Slam events, including the 2009, 2010, 2011, 2013 and 2014 editions of the Autumn Gold Curling Classic, which is no longer a Grand Slam event.

Scheidegger qualified for her first women's provincial championship in 2011, where she won two games before being eliminated after five matches. Scheidegger qualified for her second provincials in 2012 where she had the same result. She qualified once again in 2013 where she would again win her first two games, and then lose three straight. At the 2014 Alberta Scotties Tournament of Hearts, she improved upon her previous results, by winning three games before being knocked out of competition in the triple knock-out event. At the 2015 Alberta Scotties Tournament of Hearts, she finally led her team to the playoffs, before she lost to Chelsea Carey. At the 2016 Alberta Scotties Tournament of Hearts, she lost in the playoff qualifying game.

Scheidegger won her first grand slam event at the 2017 Meridian Canadian Open, which was also the first major slam she played in. Later that month, at the 2017 Alberta Scotties Tournament of Hearts, she lost in the semifinal to Val Sweeting.

Scheidegger and team played in the 2017 Canadian Olympic Curling Trials, finishing the event with a 3–5 record. Later that season, at the 2018 Alberta Scotties Tournament of Hearts, Scheidegger won the B event in the triple knockout, putting her in the A vs B page playoff against Chelsea Carey. She won that game and played Shannon Kleibrink in the final. In an extra end, she stole the win, winning the right to represent Alberta at the Scotties. At the national Scotties, Scheidegger would have a strong week, starting the tournament with a 7–1 record, but her team would take 3 key losses to finish the championship pool at 7–4, just out of the playoffs.

Scheidegger was less successful at the 2019 Alberta Scotties Tournament of Hearts, failing to qualify for the playoffs. However, strong play that season qualified her rink for a second chance in the 2019 Scotties Tournament of Hearts wild card game, where they beat Team Kerri Einarson, qualifying the team for the main event. At the Scotties, Scheidegger led her team to a 7–4 record, for a fifth-place finish, just outside the playoffs.

Year-by-year statistics

Grand Slam record
Scheidegger won her first ever Grand Slam event (excluding defunct events, which are not counted by media reports) when she won the 2017 Meridian Canadian Open.

Former events

Personal life
Scheidegger is a graduate of the University of Lethbridge. She works as a teacher with Palliser Regional Schools. She is married to Duncan Koning and they have two sons.

Notes

References

External links

1988 births
Living people
Canadian women curlers
Curlers from Alberta
Sportspeople from Lethbridge
Sportspeople from Red Deer, Alberta
Canada Cup (curling) participants
20th-century Canadian women
21st-century Canadian women